Philip Goettel (September 2, 1840 – January 30, 1920) was a Union Army soldier in the American Civil War who received the U.S. military's highest decoration, the Medal of Honor.

Goettel was born in Syracuse, where he entered service. He was awarded the Medal of Honor, for extraordinary heroism shown in Lookout Mountain, Tennessee, when he captured a flag and battery guidon while serving as a Private with the Company B of the 149th New York Infantry on November 24, 1863. His Medal of Honor was issued on June 28, 1865.

Goettel died in his native Syracuse on January 30, 1920, and was buried at Syracuse's Woodlawn Cemetery.

Medal of Honor citation

References

External links
 Philip Goettel grave at Woodlawn Cemetery (Syracuse, New York)
 
 An essay on Goettel's life and his medal at Gettysburg College

1840 births
1920 deaths
American Civil War recipients of the Medal of Honor
Burials in New York (state)
Military personnel from Syracuse, New York
People of New York (state) in the American Civil War
Union Army soldiers
United States Army Medal of Honor recipients
Burials at Woodlawn Cemetery (Syracuse, New York)